Intangible Cultural Heritage of Indonesia is a "living culture" that contains philosophical elements from the traditions of society and is still handed down from generation to generation. Edi Sedyawati (in the introduction to the Intangible Cultural Heritage Seminar, 2002) added an important element in the notion of intangible cultural heritage is the nature of culture that cannot be held (abstract), such as concepts and technology, its nature can pass and disappear in time with the times such as language, music, dance, ceremony, and various other structured behaviors. Thus, cultural heritage is shared by a community or community and experiences development from generation to generation, in the flow of a tradition. The Ministry of Education and Culture of Indonesia records and establishes a list of intangible cultural heritage. As of June 2020, a total of 9,770 cultural heritages have been recorded and 1,086 of them have been designated.

Law
The legal basis for the activities of recording, stipulating, and nominating the Intangible Cultural Heritage is as follows:

Law Number 28 of 2014 concerning Copyright (State Gazette of the Republic of Indonesia of 2014 Number 266, Supplement to the State Gazette of the Republic of Indonesia Number 5599);
Presidential Regulation of the Republic of Indonesia Number 78 of 2007 concerning Ratification of the UNESCO Convention for the Safeguarding of the Intangible Cultural Heritage of 2003 (Convention for the Protection of Intangible Cultural Heritage);
Presidential Regulation Number 7 of 2015 concerning Educational Organizations and State Ministries;
Presidential Regulation Number 14 of 2015 concerning the Ministry of Education and Culture;
Presidential Decree Number 121/P of 2014 concerning the Establishment of Ministries and the Appointment of Ministers of the Working Cabinet for the 2014-2019 Period;
Decree of the President of the Republic of Indonesia Number 42 of 2002 concerning Guidelines for the Implementation of the State Revenue and Expenditure Budget (State Gazette of the Republic of Indonesia of 2002 Number 73, Supplement to the State Gazette of the Republic of Indonesia Number 4212), as last amended by Presidential Decree Number 72 of 2004 concerning Amendments to Decisions the President Number 42 of 2002 concerning Guidelines for the Implementation of the State Revenue and Expenditure Budget (State Gazette of the Republic of Indonesia of 2004 Number 92);
Regulation of the Minister of Education and Culture Number 1 of 2012 concerning Organization and Work Procedure of the Ministry of Education and Culture as last amended by Regulation of the Minister of Education and Culture Number 25 of 2014 (State Gazette of the Republic of Indonesia of 2014 Number 459);
Regulation of the Minister of Education and Culture Number 106 of 2013 concerning Indonesian Intangible Cultural Heritage;

Background
Referring to the 2003 UNESCO convention on safeguarding of intangible cultural heritage called Intangible Cultural Heritage divided into five domains, each domain and its explanation, among others:

Performing Arts

Performing arts consist of:
 Dance: movement patterns (concentric, spreading); dancer (sex), location (palace, sacred building, field); accompaniment music (gamelan / gambelan, gendrang, a cappella); costumes (clothing colors, accessories, clothing motifs); lighting (blencong, torch, oncor, etc.); composition (group, individual, mix, etc.); purpose (sacred, profane); type; and dance forms; 
 Sound Art: singer, poetry, song lyrics, tone system, instruments, location, time, clothing, genre (type); 
 Art of Music: musical instruments, types of music, tone systems, goals, players, rules of playing musical instruments, assemblies (a combination of all musical components); 
 Theater Arts: stage, performers, plays, costumes, time, location, musical instruments, lighting.

Traditions and Oral Expressions

Cultural works included in Traditions and Oral Expressions are:
 Language: alphabet, dialect, grammar, speech act, language level
 Ancient Manuscripts: in the form of books, chronicles, written on material (stone, copper, palm-leaf, bark-daluwang, bamboo), scripts, archives (charter, chronicles, post-service memory, ROC-OV, KV), language and writing that is not used anymore, and images in the manuscript. Ancient manuscripts can be in the form of books, letters of agreement, family letters, personal letters, scriptures, primbons, collection of songs
 Traditional Games and Sports: functions (entertainment and leisure use, religious games, fitness); form of play (sparring and non-sparring); type of game (such as: takraw -aga, kite, kite); rules of the game (number of players, moves, win-lose, order); player characteristics (male, female, small child, adult, old, young, married, not yet); clothing when playing (sarong, headband); play time (afternoon, evening, night, big day, full moon); game materials (earthenware, bamboo, wood, leaf); and the location of the game (like on the beach, on the field, on an open yard) 
 Pantun: the contents of the poem, the rhymes of the poem, the grammar spoken, when it is read, the rules of reading it, the location, who is reciting, the purpose of being recited in the form of gurindam, poetry, song, poetry, poetry, pojian (religious praise), syi'ir (syllabic ( religious songs), hymns.
 Folk Story: the contents of the story, grammar, moral and meaning of the story contained, in the form of fairy tales, myth, legend, folklore, fable, epic; 
 Mantra (influence of local culture): language spoken, when it was read, rules for reading it, location, who read it, taboos and suggestions, goals; 
 Prayer (influence of religion): language spoken, when it was read, rules for reading it, location, who read it, taboos and suggestions, goals; 
 Folk song: playing, when, who (gender, stratum), location, song lyrics, accompaniment and accapella music, order of presentation. taksu, bissu.

Community Customs, Rites, and Celebrations

Community Customs, Rites, and Celebrations, consisting of:
 Traditional ceremony: individual life cycle (birth, initiation, marriage, death) and collective life cycle (cleansing the village, nyadran); purpose (sacred, reject); location (mountain, beach / coast, river, spring); participants (individuals, families, communities); time (religious calendar, harvest time, sea time); rules (restrictions and recommendations), the order of the ceremony (the stages of the implementation of ceremonial activities); completeness (offerings, accessories, equipment); 
 Customary law: Content (who issues, who is regulated, what is regulated, the form of the rules and adat sanctions)
 Social Organization System: leadership (adat, village, religion, government); structure (hierarchy); customary rules (restrictions and recommendations); social organization area (subak, banjar, wanua, banua)
 Traditional Kinship System: Types of kinship, hierarchy, relationships between hierarchies, rules of kinship
 Traditional Economic System: market based on the market (pound, kliwon, legi, wage); market based on days (Sunday, Monday, Tuesday, Wednesday, Thursday, Friday, Saturday); barter (exchanging catches and crops, renting houses with agricultural produce), bargaining, method of payment (cash, installments, auction, bonded labor, slash);
 Traditional Festival: destination (sacred, reject); location (mountain, beach / coast, river, spring); participants (individuals, families, communities); time (religious calendar, harvest time, sea time); rules (restrictions and recommendations), the order of the festival (the stages of the implementation of festival activities); completeness (offerings, accessories, equipment), organizer / committee;

Knowledge and Habits of Behavior Regarding Nature and the Universe

Knowledge and Habits of Behavior Regarding Nature and the Universe, consisting of:
 Knowledge about nature, (microcosm, macrocosm, adaptation, natural processing); Cosmology (astrology; date; navigation);
 Local Wisdom: disaster mitigation (cultural-based disaster risk reduction), ecological conservation, harmony of life, tolerance; 
 Traditional Medicine: healing options, treatment techniques, treatment materials, healers (sanro, herbalists, sekerei, suwanggi, belian, psychics, orang pintar, physicians, sinshes); etiology of the disease (factors causing disease).

Traditional Crafts Skills and Proficiency
 
Traditional Crafts Skills and Proficiency, consisting of
 Traditional Technology (manufacturing process, design and construction, how tools work, objectives, importance of technology for the surrounding community)
 Traditional Architecture (building design guidance, anthropometrics - building sizes based on the human body - fathoms, inch, yelp, rare); anthropomorphic (building forms based on the human body); building based on decorative motifs; maker (pandrita lopi, pande); the direction of the building (kaja-kelod, luan-teben); division of page functions (jaba; jaba-middle; jero); division of function space; buildings are determined by status (jahe -julu). 
 Traditional Clothing: (philosophy of form, material, decoration, color, type of accessories); user status; time and procedure for use; function (sacred, profane); user gender
 Traditional Accessories: (philosophy of shape, material, design, color); user status; the location of usage; user gender; time and procedure for use; function (sacred, profane); 
 Traditional Crafts: materials (clay, wood, fabric, iron, stone, rattan, sticks, bamboo); tooling; craftsmen (pande sikek, gozali); handiwork (crafts, embroidery, plaiting, pottery, weaving); workmanship techniques (knitting, forging, woven, carving, weaving) 
 Traditional cuisine: recipes (randang, porridge tinutuan, warm, cone); food ingredients (animal, plant); process (barapen - burnt stone -, boiled, fumigated, fermented, cooked with sand, roasted, burned, steamed, steamed, combustion with mud media); cook (male or female; old or young), time of presentation (morning, afternoon, evening, transitional ceremony, religious ceremony, state / royal ceremony), location of presentation (religious buildings, palaces, sacred areas, government buildings, mountains, sea, forest), presentation procedures (appetizers, core food, desserts), destinations (sacred, profane), serving media (shell, ongke, earthenware, leaves, plaits, shells, metal / brass containers); the meaning of food (restoring enthusiasm, success, purity), cooking utensils (steaming, frying pan, stove, brazier, sutil, scoop, irus), how to eat (using hands or using tools). 
 Media of Transportation: knowledge about animals that can be used for transportation (horses: have origins - salasila horses -); knowledge of making modes of transportation (dokar, cart, colic, pinisi, sope-sope, padewakang) 
 Traditional Weapons: philosophy of making weapons (legitimacy of origin); materials (metal, iron, wood, leather, bamboo, rattan), functions and roles (security, preaching, authority, supernatural powers, substitution of masculine identities, symbols of war, surrender, humiliation); makers (masters, undagi, pande), weapons users, procedures for use (abstinence / prohibition on the use of weapons and recommendations), time (holidays, religious celebrations, when there is a disaster - jamasan -), the manufacturing process (forged, granting prestige and warangan, granting warangka, making upstream / holding arms / bees' buttocks, complementing weapons (holsters), ornaments (stones and carvings).

Indonesia UNESCO's Intangible Cultural Heritage

List by province

Aceh

North Sumatra

West Sumatra

Bengkulu

Riau

Riau Islands

Jambi

South Sumatra

Lampung

Bangka Belitung Islands

Jakarta

West Java

Banten

Central Java

Yogyakarta

East Java

West Kalimantan

Central Kalimantan

South Kalimantan

East Kalimantan

North Kalimantan

Bali

West Nusa Tenggara

East Nusa Tenggara

West Sulawesi

South Sulawesi

Central Sulawesi

Southeast Sulawesi

North Sulawesi

Gorontalo

Maluku

North Maluku

West Papua

Papua

Joint heritage

See also 

 Culture of Indonesia
 Indonesian art

References

External links 
 

Indonesian culture